Mr. Shovel's Check One Two is a radio program that most recently aired on 95.5 KLOS in Los Angeles, California from January 2016 to August 2019. The show originally aired on Indie 103.1 in Los Angeles from February 2004 to January 2009. The show, which featured local and independent artists and live performances, was created by host Mr. Shovel (Mark Sovel), Indie 103.1's music director and the producer of Jonesy's Jukebox hosted by Sex Pistols member Steve Jones. Jones bestowed the nickname "Mr. Shovel" after continuously mispronouncing Sovel's real name. In 2004, Indie 103.1 was dubbed "America's Coolest Commercial Station" by Rolling Stone magazine and  again voted "Best Radio Station" in 2008.

Check One Two aired Sunday nights from 6pm to 8pm on Indie 103.1 and gave many Los Angeles–area bands their first commercial radio airplay. This led to several unsigned local bands getting added to "regular rotation" on Indie 103.1 and often led to significant record deals. Some notable names that received early support from Indie 103.1 and Check One Two were The Airborne Toxic Event, Silversun Pickups, She Wants Revenge, Cold War Kids, Warpaint, and The Submarines.

Mr. Shovel made music news in the winter of 2008 when he, and Indie 103.1 program director Max Tolkoff, were summoned to the home of Prince,
who played for them a new record which would later be called Lotusflower.  Prince handed Shovel and Tolkoff the music to take with them to premiere on Indie 103.1.  Shovel appeared the following day on Jonesy's Jukebox with the music and stories about the visit.

On January 15, 2009, Indie suddenly went off the air to be replaced by a Spanish-language format. Indie 103.1 and Check One Two's support is regarded as having been a uniting factor in the local music scene in Los Angeles in the first decade of the 21st century.

After returning to the FM dial in January 2016, Mr. Shovel's Check One Two championed a new era of artists such as Starcrawler, Phoebe Bridgers, Plague Vendor, The Interrupters and Weyes Blood. The show aired live every Sunday night at 8pm Pacific time on KLOS. Also, in October 2015 Mr. Shovel re-joined Steve Jones as producer and on-air foil for a new incarnation of Jonesy's Jukebox on 95.KLOS every Monday through Friday from noon to 2pm Pacific time.

References

External links 
 MrShovel.com

2000s American radio programs
American music radio programs